Bernard E. Heselton (January 25, 1903 – February 6, 1981) was an American football coach.  He served as the head football coach at Lawrence University in Appleton, Wisconsin, from 1938 to 1964.  During his career, Heselton won six Midwest Collegiate Athletic Conference (MCAC) championships, including the first in his initial season as Vikings' head coach.  He amassed a 111–79–5 overall record, the second-most wins in university history.  Heselton, who grew up in South St. Paul, Minnesota, died in February 1981.

Early life
Heselton was born January 25, 1903, in Saint Paul, Minnesota.  He attended South Saint Paul High School, Hamline University and the University of Minnesota, where he graduated in 1925.  Bernie starred in football and basketball while at Hamline.

Heselton married Alice Nellermoe. The couple had two daughters, Mary and Janet.

Coaching career
Heselton started his coaching career at Central High School, in Duluth, Minnesota, in 1925, then moving on to East Division High School in Milwaukee, Wisconsin, in 1928, where he coached for ten years.  His teams at East Division won 58 games, lost 16, and tied 6. They won six conference championships, five in succession with four undefeated seasons and a string of 32 straight wins.

While Heselton served as head coach at Lawrence University, the Vikings won the Midwest Collegiate Athletic Conference (MCAC) championships, in 1938, 1942, 1946, 1947, 1949 and 1951.  In addition to his coaching duties at Lawrence, Heselton served as the school's athletic director from 1961 to 1970.

Honors and legacy
Heselton's coaching accomplishments led to his induction to the state of Wisconsin Athletic Hall of Fame in 1981, the Wisconsin Football Coaches Association Hall of Fame in 1982, and was part the inaugural class of the Lawrence University Athletic Hall of Fame in 1996.

In 1988, to commemorate the 25 years of rivalry between Carl Doehling of Ripon College and Heselton, the two schools instituted the Doehling–Heselton Memorial Trophy.  The winner of the annual game between the Red Hawks and the Vikings is awarded this traveling trophy.

Head coaching record

College football

References

External links
 

1903 births
1981 deaths
American men's basketball players
Basketball players from Saint Paul, Minnesota
Coaches of American football from Minnesota
Hamline Pipers football players
Hamline Pipers men's basketball players
High school football coaches in Minnesota
High school football coaches in Wisconsin
Lawrence Vikings football coaches
Players of American football from Saint Paul, Minnesota